Religion is any cultural system of designated behaviors and practices, world views, texts, sanctified places, ethics, or organizations, that relate humanity to the supernatural or transcendental.

Religion may also refer to:

Religion (virtue), a concept in Christian theology and ethics
Religion (journal), an academic journal
Religion (Niagara album), 1990
Religion (Spear of Destiny album), 1997
"Religion", a song by Lana Del Rey from Honeymoon, 2015
The Religion, a 1982 novel by Nicholas Conde

See also 
"Religious" (song), by R. Kelly, 2009
Mythology, a body or collection of myths